Hitzendorf is a municipality in the district of Graz-Umgebung in the Austrian state of Styria.

Subdivisions
It comprises Altenberg, Altreiteregg, Berndorf, Doblegg, Hitzendorf, Höllberg, Holzberg, Mayersdorf, Michlbach, Neureiteregg, Niederberg, Oberberg and Pirka.

Population

Personalities
Fritz Zweigelt, breeder of the Zweigelt red wine grape variety, was born here in 1888.

References

Lavanttal Alps
Cities and towns in Graz-Umgebung District